The 1987 Transamerica Open, also known as the Pacific Coast Championships, was a men's tennis tournament played on indoor carpet courts at the Cow Palace in San Francisco, California in the United States. The event was part of the 1987 Nabisco Grand Prix circuit. It was the 99th edition of the tournament and was held from September 28 through October 4, 1987. Unseeded Peter Lundgren won the singles title.

Finals

Singles
 Peter Lundgren defeated  Jim Pugh 6–1, 7–5
 It was Lundgren's 2nd singles title of the year and the 3rd of his career.

Doubles
 Jim Grabb /  John McEnroe defeated  Glenn Layendecker /  Todd Witsken 6–2, 0–6, 6–4

References

Transamerica Open
Pacific Coast International Open
Transamerica Open
Transamerica Open
Transamerica Open
Transamerica Open